American Cyborg: Steel Warrior is a 1993 science fiction action film directed by Boaz Davidson and released by Global Pictures. John Ryan plays the android assassin in the future to kill Mary, a woman who was able to give life to a fetus played by Nicole Hansen. Joe Lara plays Austin, a mercenary who is actually a cyborg, but vows to protect Mary.

American Cyborg: Steel Warrior was the 2nd to last film to be theatrically released by Cannon Followed by Hellbound.

Premise
After World War III people are sterile and ruled by the artificial intelligences they created in this violent world. The only woman who was able to give life to a fetus has to take it through the dangerous city of Charleston, South Carolina to the port where a ship is on its way to Europe. She is followed by an android assassin through all the dangers, and only one man tries to help her survive and protect her from the killing machine.

Cast
 Joe Lara as Austin (cyborg)
 Nicole Hansen as Mary
 John Saint Ryan as Android Assassin (John Ryan)
 Yosef Shiloach as Akmir
 Uri Gavriel as Leech Leader
 Hellen Lesnick as Carp
 Andrea Litt as Arlene
 Jack Widerker as Dr. Ben Buckley
 Kevin Patterson as Runner Underground Lab Worker
 P.C. Frieberg as Starving Old Man
 Nicole Berger as Hooker
 Allen Nashman as Underground Lab Scientist
 Jack Adalist as Main Thug
 David Milton Johnes as Paramedic on Rescue Boat
 Eric Storch as Main Scavenger

Year-end lists 
 Top 10 worst (not ranked) – Dan Webster, The Spokesman-Review

References

External links
 
 
 https://web.archive.org/web/20131022151843/http://www.planetfury.com/content/american-cyborg-steel-warrior
 http://www.comeuppancereviews.com/2010/08/american-cyborg-steel-warrior-1993.html

1994 films
1990s science fiction action films
American science fiction action films
Android (robot) films
American post-apocalyptic films
Films directed by Boaz Davidson
Golan-Globus films
American dystopian films
1990s English-language films
American exploitation films
Films with screenplays by Boaz Davidson
1990s American films
Films set in Charleston, South Carolina